Gopalan Kasturi (17 December 1924 – 21 September 2012) was an Indian journalist who served as the Editor of The Hindu from 1965 to 1991. He was a grandson of S. Kasturi Rangya Iyengar, the patriarch of the family that owns The Hindu. Kasturi became the editor of the newspaper after the death of S. Parthasarathy, who was an uncle. Kasturi was the longest serving editor of the newspaper.

Personal life 
Kasturi was born in Madras on 17 December 1924 to K. Gopalan and Ranganayaki. He was the grandson of S. Kasturi Ranga Iyengar, the patriarch of the Kasturi family, who died a year before he was born.  Kasturi graduated from the Presidency College, Madras and joined The Hindu, the family newspaper.

Kasturi married Kamala and has two sons and a daughter - K. Balaji, K. Venugopal and Lakshmi Srinath. Kasturi's elder brother, G. Narasimhan, served as Managing-Director of The Hindu from 1959 to 1977.

Editorship 
Kasturi became the Editor of The Hindu in 1965 on the early death of its editor, S. Parthasarathy. Kasturi served as its editor from 1965 to 1991. Kasturi retired in 1991 and was succeeded by N. Ravi.

Death 
Kasturi died on 21 September 2012 at the age of 88 at his home in Chennai. His death came a day after the 134th anniversary of the founding of The Hindu newspaper.

Notes

References 
 

1924 births
2012 deaths
Presidency College, Chennai alumni
Writers from Chennai
Indian newspaper editors
The Hindu journalists
Indian male journalists
Journalists from Tamil Nadu
20th-century Indian journalists